Gabriel Overton   is a professional footballer who plays as a striker for  league 1  side peterborough  .

Early life
Overton spent time in the youth sides at both Peterborough United and Norwich City. Overton was also a talented tennis player and had to choose between following a football or tennis career. His initial focus had been on tennis whilst at Town Close School in Norwich, becoming Norfolk #1 approaching his teens. Consequently, he did not play much football before he was 13 and began attending Hethersett Academy in Norfolk. From the age of 14 Overton focused more on football. He signed a professional contract with Peterborough in May 2022 shortly after his 17th birthday.

Career
Overton made his professional football debut as a 77th minute substitute for Ricky-Jade Jones in Peterborough's 2–0 EFL Cup first round win at Home Park against Plymouth Argyle on 10 August 2022, aged 17yrs 174dys.

References

Living people
Peterborough United F.C. players
Sportspeople from Norfolk
Footballers from Norfolk
English footballers
Year of birth missing (living people)